Dragan Lovrić (born 3 January 1996) is a Croatian professional footballer who plays as a defender for Kryvbas Kryvyi Rih.

Club career
As a youth player, Lovrić joined the youth academy of Italian Serie A side Catania.

In 2015, he was sent on loan to Akragas in the Italian third division.

In 2016, he was sent on loan to Croatian top flight club Šibenik.

Before the second half of 2019/20, Lovrić signed for Dugopolje in the Croatian second division.

In 2020, he signed for Slovenian team Mura from Zrinjski in Bosnia and Herzegovina.

References

External links
 
 

1996 births
Living people
Footballers from Split, Croatia
Association football defenders
Croatian footballers
Croatia youth international footballers
Catania S.S.D. players
S.S. Akragas Città dei Templi players
HNK Šibenik players
U.S. Alessandria Calcio 1912 players
NK Dugopolje players
NŠ Mura players
FC Kryvbas Kryvyi Rih players
Serie C players
First Football League (Croatia) players
Slovenian PrvaLiga players
Ukrainian Premier League players
Ukrainian First League players
Croatian expatriate footballers
Expatriate footballers in Italy
Croatian expatriate sportspeople in Italy
Expatriate footballers in Slovenia
Croatian expatriate sportspeople in Slovenia
Expatriate footballers in Ukraine
Croatian expatriate sportspeople in Ukraine